Persaud is a Hindu surname, primarily found in Guyana, Suriname, Fiji, South Africa, Mauritius, Trinidad and Tobago, and other parts of the Caribbean. It is derived from the Hindi surname प्रसाद which is predominantly transliterated as Prasad in India. Other variant forms include Persad, Persard, Pershard, Prasada, Prashad, Presad, and Presaud.  

The surname primarily originated in the Hindi Belt of India, especially in the present-day states of Bihar, Uttar Pradesh, Jharkhand, and Madhya Pradesh; it also originated in the neighboring Terai-Madhesh region of Nepal. Persaud is the most prevalent surname in Guyana with 21,855  Guyanese persons documented to hold the name. It is the 22nd most prevalent name in Suriname. Persad is also the sixteenth most prevalent surname in Trinidad and Tobago and the other variant, Persaud, is the 431st most prevalent surname. Persaud is also the number one most popular Hindu surname in the United States, based on data from the 2010 U.S. census.

Etymology and history 
The name Persaud means "Gracious gift" originally deriving from Hindi "Prasad". The name has connection to multiple Dharmic religions including Hinduism, Jainism and Sikhism where "Prasada" is a food that is used in religious offering.

Geographical distribution 
Persaud is the most common surname in Guyana, where 1 in 35 persons hold the surname; it is also an increasingly common name in Canada, ranking 862nd, and the UK where 1 in 52,000 hold the surname. This is due to a large amount of Indo-Caribbean immigration to North America and Europe (mainly the United Kingdom and the Netherlands).

Notable people named Persaud

Persaud
Anjulie Persaud (b. 1983), an Indo-Guyanese Canadian singer
Avinash Persaud (b. 1966), an Indo-Bajan businessman
Bernadette Indira Persaud (b. 1946), Indo-Guyanese painter
Bishnodat Persaud (1933-2016), a British Indo-Guyanese economist
Deborah Persaud (b. 1960), an Indo-Guyanese American virologist
Kriskal Persaud (b. 1974), an Indo-Guyanese chess player
Lakshmi Persaud (b. 1939), a British Indo-Trinidadian writer
Nikhil Persaud, a British poker player
Rajendra Persaud (b. 1963), a British Indo-Trinidadian/Indo-Guyanese psychiatrist
Reepu Daman Persaud (1936-2013), an Indo-Guyanese former agricultural minister of Guyana
Robert Persaud (b. 1974), Guyanese Foreign Secretary and former minister
Roxanne Persaud (b. 1966), Indian-African Guyanese American politician
Shanta Persaud, diabetes researcher and academic

Persad
Kamla Persad-Bissessar (b. 1952), first woman to be Prime Minister of Trinidad and Tobago
Ria Persad (also known as Ria Persad Carlo) (born 1974), a Trinidad and Tobago mathematician, classical musician and model

Prashad
Thara Prashad (born 1982) - singer and model

References

Indian surnames
Surnames of Indian origin
Hindustani-language surnames
Hindu surnames
Indo-Caribbean
Indian diaspora in Fiji
Indo-Guyanese people
Indian diaspora in Suriname
Indian diaspora in South Africa
Indian diaspora in Mauritius
Indian diaspora in Trinidad and Tobago